"Friends" is a song recorded by American singer Blake Shelton. It was released as the first promotional single from Shelton's tenth studio album, If I'm Honest (2016). It is the theme song to the 2016 animated film The Angry Birds Movie where Shelton provided voice-over for a pig. The track was written by both Shelton and Jessi Alexander, who had collaborated before on Blake Shelton's "Drink on It", and "Mine Would Be You".

The song is about two unlikely friends sticking together, despite them being "different as different can be". The song describes how friends may fight, but "in the end [they] are gonna be friends".

The song was issued as a digital download on April 8, 2016. A music video for the song was also released.

Chart performance 
After the initial release of "Friends", the song only peaked on one record chart, the US Kid Digital Songs component chart. For the week ending April 30, 2016, it debuted and peaked at number three, before departing the chart an additional four weeks later.

Charts

References 

2016 singles
2016 songs
2010s ballads
Blake Shelton songs
Atlantic Records singles
Warner Records Nashville singles
Warner Records singles
Songs about friendship
Songs written for animated films
Songs written by Blake Shelton
Songs written by Jessi Alexander
Song recordings produced by Scott Hendricks
Music videos directed by Trey Fanjoy